Dominik Holec (born 28 July 1994) is a Slovak professional footballer who plays as a goalkeeper for Lech Poznań, on loan from Czech First League club Sparta Prague.

Club career

FC ViOn Zlaté Moravce
Holec made his Fortuna Liga debut for ViOn Zlaté Moravce in an away loss on 26 February 2017 in a match against his mother club Žilina. Holec conceded four goals in a 4-1 defeat, being beaten by Miroslav Káčer, future international Samuel Mráz, season's top scorer Filip Hlohovský and Lukáš Jánošík.

MŠK Žilina
Holec was released from Žilina, as the club had entered liquidation, due to a coronavirus pandemic.

Sparta Prague
On 28 May 2020, it was announced that commencing the following season, Holec would become the goalkeeper of Czech club Sparta Prague. It was also revealed, that Sparta had previously been interested in Holec, prior to his release from Žilina, and he had signed for the Czech side despite interest from unnamed Belgian and Spanish teams. Holec had cited the approach of club official Tomáš Rosický as a strong factor in the decision to join the club.

International career
Holec enjoyed his first inclusion in the wider squad of Slovak senior national team in November 2019, when he was listed as an alternate by Pavel Hapal for two qualifying UEFA Euro 2020 qualifying fixtures against Croatia and Azerbaijan. Holec actually went on to join the squad, hence being called-up from the alternate position, as Dominik Greif could not be involved fully in preparations ahead of the Azerbaijan fixture. Holec therefore enjoyed his first call-up, but did not manage to make an appearance. Holec was also additionally called up in September 2021, when Dušan Kuciak tested positive for COVID-19, but again failed to make an appearance.

In March 2022, Holec was nominated for two friendly fixtures against Norway and Finland. He did not make an appearance on 25 March 2022 in Oslo fixture against Norway, which concluded in a 2-0 defeat, following strikes by Erling Haaland and Martin Ødegaard. Days late, Holec appeared in the starting line-up in the subsequent match, debuting on 29 March 2022 in a neutral field international friendly against Finland. Following an agreement with goalkeeper's coach Miroslav Seman, Holec and a fellow debutant František Plach were to both feature for one half of the game. During the first half, Holec faced two shots from the opposing team. The match concluded in a 2-0 victory, after a first-half strike by Ondrej Duda and a second-half securing goal by Erik Jirka. Following the match, Holec and Plach both praised the defensive line commanded by Milan Škriniar, expressed pride over representing their nation and claimed that lack of spectators was the only regret related to their debut.

Personal life
Holec is a Slovak although he was born in present-day Czech Republic, in České Budějovice, to father Peter, who played in local Dynamo at the time, and an ethnic Czech mother. He also has a brother. During his spell in Lech Poznań, he described his family as a Czecho-Slovak mix.

Career statistics

Club

Honours
Raków Częstochowa
Polish Cup: 2020–21

References

External links
 Eurofotbal profile
 ]
 Futbalnet profile

1994 births
Living people
Sportspeople from České Budějovice
Slovak footballers
Slovakia youth international footballers
Slovakia international footballers
Association football goalkeepers
MŠK Žilina players
OFK Teplička nad Váhom players
FK Pohronie players
FC ViOn Zlaté Moravce players
FK Senica players
AC Sparta Prague players
Raków Częstochowa players
Lech Poznań players
Slovak Super Liga players
2. Liga (Slovakia) players
Ekstraklasa players
Expatriate footballers in the Czech Republic
Expatriate footballers in Poland
Slovak expatriate sportspeople in Poland
Slovak expatriate sportspeople in the Czech Republic